Niamoué is a town in the far northeast of Ivory Coast. It is a sub-prefecture of Doropo Department in Bounkani Region, Zanzan District.

Niamoué was a commune until March 2012, when it became one of 1126 communes nationwide that were abolished.

In 2014, the population of the sub-prefecture of Niamoué was 16,056.

Villages
The seventy five villages of the sub-prefecture of Niamoué and their population in 2014 are:

Notes

Sub-prefectures of Bounkani
Former communes of Ivory Coast